Tomé is a city in Chile.

Tomé may also refer to

Places
San Tomé (disambiguation)
Santo Tomé (disambiguation)
São Tomé (disambiguation)
Negrelos (São Tomé), a place in Portugal
Roman Catholic Diocese of Santo Tomé, Argentina

People
Tomé (Angolan footballer) (born 1998)
Tomé (Portuguese footballer) (born 1986)
Tomé de Barros Queirós (1872–1925), Portuguese politician
Tomé Pires (c. 1465–c. 1540), Portuguese apothecary
Tomé de Sousa (1515–1573), governor-general of Brazil
Tomé Vera Cruz (born 1955?), Prime Minister of São Tomé and Príncipe
João Manuel Pinto Tomé (born 1973), Portuguese footballer
Narciso Tomé (1690–1742), Spanish architect
Tomé Barbosa de Figueiredo Almeida Cardoso (died c. 1821), Portuguese linguist
Dionísio Tomé Dias (born 1943), São Toméan politician